Michael Austin Riley (born April 2, 1997) is an American professional baseball third baseman for the Atlanta Braves of Major League Baseball (MLB). The Braves selected him in the first round, 41st overall, of the 2015 MLB Draft.

Born in Memphis and raised in Mississippi, Riley played football and baseball at DeSoto Central High School. A star pitcher and third baseman in high school, Riley originally committed to play college baseball at Mississippi State University, before being drafted by the Braves and opting to forgo a college baseball career. Riley made his minor league debut in 2015 with the Gulf Coast Braves and would spend the next several seasons in the Braves farm system.

Riley made his MLB debut with the Braves in 2019. After a slow start to his major league career in 2019, Riley would soon emerge as a star, winning a Silver Slugger Award in 2021, as well as that year's World Series. Following a strong start to the 2022 season, Riley signed a franchise-record ten-year contract extension worth $212 million.

Early life
Austin Riley is the eldest son of Mike and Elisa Riley. Riley attended DeSoto Central High School in Southaven, Mississippi, where he played baseball as a shortstop and pitcher. Riley played American football as a quarterback during his freshman and sophomore years in high school. Though he expressed a desire to quit football and focus on baseball, the football coach chose to retain Riley as a punter, a position his father had played at Mississippi State University. Riley was committed to play for the Mississippi State Bulldogs baseball team until he was drafted by the Atlanta Braves in 2015. MSU had also offered Riley the chance to play football for the Bulldogs as a punter.

Career

Draft and minor leagues 
The Atlanta Braves selected Riley in the first round, with the 41st overall selection, in the 2015 MLB draft. Though he was committed to Mississippi State Bulldogs baseball team, Riley chose to sign with the Braves for $1.6 million. Riley made his professional debut with the Gulf Coast Braves that season. After 30 games, he was promoted to the Danville Braves in the Appalachian League. Overall in 60 games he batted .304/.389/.544 with 12 home runs over 217 at-bats, while on defense he committed 16 errors for a .908 fielding percentage. 

In 2016, Riley played for the Rome Braves of the Class A South Atlantic League. he batted .271/.324/.479. On defense, he committed 30 errors at third base.

The Braves invited Riley to spring training as a non-roster player in 2017. He began the 2017 season with the Florida Fire Frogs of the Class A-Advanced Florida State League. He was promoted to the Mississippi Braves of the Class AA Southern League in July. In 129 games between Florida and Mississippi, Riley hit .275/.339/.446 with 20 home runs and 74 RBIs, while on defense he committed 20 errors at third base. He was assigned to the Peoria Javelinas of the Arizona Fall League at the end of the minor league regular season. Prior to the start of the 2018 season, Riley received an invitation to spring training. He was ranked among the top prospects in the minor leagues prior to the season. 

He began 2018 with Mississippi, and after batting .333 with six home runs and 20 RBIs in 27 games, and was promoted to the Gwinnett Stripers in May. In 75 games with Gwinnett, he hit .282/.346/.464/.810 with 12 home runs and 47 RBI. He opened the 2019 season with Gwinnett.

Atlanta Braves 
On May 15, 2019, Riley was called up to the Atlanta Braves prior to their game against the St. Louis Cardinals. Riley was promoted after Ender Inciarte was placed on the injured list. He made his major league debut that night and, in his second at bat, hit a home run off Michael Wacha. On May 29, 2019, Riley, despite a 14-4 blowout loss to the Nationals, hit his first career grand slam, marking his seventh home run in fourteen career games and bringing his RBI total to twenty. At the time, his seven home runs in fourteen games were the second most to begin a career, trailing only Trevor Story (Aristides Aquino has since passed them both with nine). On June 1, he hit his eighth home run in 16 games, becoming the fourth player in major league baseball history to achieve this feat. He was also the fastest player in Braves franchise history to do so. Riley earned the NL Rookie of the Month Award for May 2019, despite only playing in 15 games.

On August 8, 2019, Riley was placed on the 10-day injured list due to a right knee sprain, retroactive to August 5. It was later revealed that Riley had a partial tear in his lateral collateral ligament that he sustained while working out. Riley began a rehab assignment on August 22 with the Rome Braves, and as of September 1 was continuing to rehab with the Gwinnett Stripers.In 2019 with the Braves he batted .226/.279/.471 with 18 home runs and 49 RBIs in 274 at bats, as on defense he played 58 games in left field, six at first base, five at third base, and two in right field.

In 2020 he batted .239/.301/.415 with 8 home runs and 27 RBIs in 188 at bats. On defense, he  played primarily third base (46 games), with four games each at first base and in left field. His six errors were the third-most among NL third basemen.

After beginning the 2021 season in a hitting slump that saw him go 8-for-44 with no extra-base hits, Riley made a significant change to the mental aspect of his at bats, working with minor league hitting coach Mike Brumley to recognize where an off-speed pitch would land, and avoid swinging at the sliders that pitchers had used against him in prior years. After batting in the back half of the lineup through late May, Riley was promoted to cleanup hitter, where he helped push the Braves back to the top of the NL East. 

He finished the 2021 season hitting .303 with 33 home runs (10th in the NL), 107 RBIs (2nd), 168 strikeouts (4th), and a .898 OPS, joining Eddie Mathews and Chipper Jones as the only Atlanta third basemen to hit .300 with at least 30 home runs and 100 RBIs in a season at the age of 24 or younger. Ozzie Albies put up similar numbers, and the pair became the fifth set of teammates to individually construct 30-home run, 100-RBI seasons at the age of 24 or younger. On defense, his 14 errors were second-most among NL third basemen, while his 300 assists ranked first.

On October 16, 2021, Riley recorded his first career walk-off hit in Game 1 of the NLCS against the Los Angeles Dodgers, allowing Ozzie Albies to score and the Braves to win 3–2. In Game 6, Riley had 2 hits and 1 RBI to help the Braves close out the series. The Braves would eventually go onto win the 2021 World Series, earning Riley his first World Series ring. After the season ended, Riley and three teammates (Freddie Freeman, Max Fried, and Ozzie Albies) won the Silver Slugger Awards for their respective positions.

Riley was eligible for salary arbitration for the first time during the 2022 season. He sought to earn $4.25 million, and was instead awarded $3.95 million. On July 11, 2022, it was announced that Riley had earned Player of the Week honors for the first time in his career. On July 16, Riley was added to the MLB All Star Team as an injury replacement for Nolan Arenado. Riley set a franchise record by recording 26 extra base hits in July. He later won the NL Player of the Month award for July 2022, the first such award in his career. On August 1, the Braves announced that Riley had been signed to a ten-year contract extension, worth $212 million. The contract is the largest in team history, exceeding the length and total value of an extension signed by teammate Matt Olson before the 2022 season began. On August 9, Riley hit his thirtieth home run and, in 111 games, tied Hank Aaron as the quickest players in franchise history to hit thirty doubles and thirty home runs in the same season.

Personal life
Riley and his wife, Anna, were married in November 2018. They resided in Coldwater, Mississippi. They announced in October 2021 they were expecting their first child, and their son was born in April 2022. The family later moved to Riley's hometown of Hernando, Mississippi.

Riley's cousin Keegan James did attend Mississippi State and played baseball there. James was selected by the Colorado Rockies in the 25th round of the 2019 Major League Baseball draft.

References

External links

1997 births
Living people
People from Southaven, Mississippi
Baseball players from Mississippi
Baseball players from Memphis, Tennessee
Major League Baseball third basemen
Major League Baseball outfielders
Atlanta Braves players
Danville Braves players
Florida Fire Frogs players
Gulf Coast Braves players
Gwinnett Stripers players
Mississippi Braves players
National League All-Stars
Peoria Javelinas players
Rome Braves players
Silver Slugger Award winners
People from Hernando, Mississippi